Pseudocarpidium is a genus of flowering plants in the family Lamiaceae first described in 1906. It is native the West Indies (Bahamas, Cuba, Hispaniola).

Species
 Pseudocarpidium avicennioides (A.Rich.) Millsp. - eastern Cuba
 Pseudocarpidium domingense (Urb. & Ekman) Moldenke - Hispaniola
 Pseudocarpidium ilicifolium (A.Rich.) Millsp. - Cuba
 Pseudocarpidium multidens (Urb.) Moldenke - eastern Cuba
 Pseudocarpidium neglecta Bisse - Cuba
 Pseudocarpidium pungens Britton - eastern Cuba
 Pseudocarpidium rigens (Griseb.) Britton - eastern Cuba
 Pseudocarpidium shaferi Britton - eastern Cuba
 Pseudocarpidium wrightii Millsp. - Bahamas, Cuba

References

Lamiaceae
Lamiaceae genera
Medicinal plants